The killing of Charley Leundeu Keunang, a 43-year-old Cameroonian national, occurred in Los Angeles, California, on March 1, 2015. He was shot by three Los Angeles Police Department officers.

On December 1, 2016, the Los Angeles County District Attorney's Office announced that no criminal charges would be filed against the officers who shot Keunang, and that they considered it an act of self-defense. Later on May 10, 2018, the Superior Court of California ruled that an officer used an unreasonable amount of force against Keunang and the case was settled with paying his family $1.95 million by the city.

Shooting

Charley Leundeu Keunang went by the names of "Africa", "Cameroon", or "Charley Saturmin Robinet" (using a stolen ID).  He was ordered by police to come out of his tent in Skid Row after fighting with someone inside the tent.  A caller to 911 reported that a robbery had occurred in the area. The caller told the arriving officers that Keunang had also threatened them with a baseball bat. The officers stated that Keunang became aggressive and ignored commands. After he refused the police order, he went inside his tent and officers pulled the tent open and a physical altercation ensued with several police officers, during which three officers shot Keunang, resulting in his death. According to National Public Radio, police claimed Keunang had gotten hold of one of the officers' guns during the struggle. At least two videos captured the incident.

Aftermath
Following Keunang's death, a protest was held locally in Los Angeles.  The protesters organised using the hashtag #BlackLivesMatter.  Fourteen people were arrested in the course of the protest.

Legal proceedings
The shooting was reviewed by the district attorney's office, the Police Commission and its independent inspector general.

In February 2016, the Los Angeles Police Commission, the civilian panel that oversees the department, ruled that the shooting did not violate their policy on the use of deadly force, as Keunang had reached for an officer's weapon.  The incident resulted in improvements in the training of officers as to how to better handle incidents involving people with mental health issues.

On December 1, 2016, the Los Angeles County District Attorney's Office announced that they would not file criminal charges against the officers who shot Keunang (Francisco Martinez, Daniel Torres, and Chand Syed).  Prosecutors stated that the officers acted in self-defense.

On August 5, 2015, Keunang's parents and sister had filed a lawsuit against the city and Police Chief Charlie Beck. On May 10, 2018, the federal jury of seven women and one man found that Francisco Martinez used an unreasonable amount of force against Keunang. They also found that Sgt. Chand Syed breached his duty to intervene. Lawyers for both sides agreed on a settlement in which the city would pay the man's family $1.95 million, according to Joshua Piovia-Scott, an attorney representing the family.

It was believed that the videos captured by the officers' body cameras, which were kept secret for years, were crucial for winning this case. According to the law firm representing Keunang's family in the lawsuit, the footage showed officers had the opportunity to deescalate the situation but instead became more aggressive to Keunang and was threatened, punched, tased and finally shot Keunang 5 times. It was argued that the officers' actions escalated this situation and caused it to spiral out of control.

See also
 Black Lives Matter

References

2015 deaths
2015 in California
Black Lives Matter
Deaths by firearm in California
Filmed killings by law enforcement
History of Los Angeles
Law enforcement in California
African people shot dead by law enforcement officers in the United States
Protests in the United States
Los Angeles Police Department